Oreste Grossi (14 March 1912 – 16 February 2008) was an Italian rower who competed in the 1936 Summer Olympics.

He was born and died in Livorno.

In 1936 he won the silver medal as crew member of the Italian boat in the men's eight event.

External links
 profile

1912 births
2008 deaths
Italian male rowers
Olympic rowers of Italy
Rowers at the 1936 Summer Olympics
Olympic silver medalists for Italy
Sportspeople from Livorno
Olympic medalists in rowing
Medalists at the 1936 Summer Olympics
European Rowing Championships medalists